Rafik Petrosyan (1 May 1940 – 17 December 2021) was an Armenian politician who served as a member of the National Assembly. He died on 17 December 2021, at the age of 81.

References

1940 births
2021 deaths
Republican Party of Armenia politicians
Members of the National Assembly (Armenia)
Academic staff of Yerevan State University
People from Vanadzor